Dina Bova (born June 16, 1977) is an Israeli photographer, digital artist and artificial intelligence researcher, notable for her surrealist photography.

She has won the grand prize at the Nikon Photo Contest for 2012–2013 with the photograph Elegy of Autumn.

Art career
Dina Bova specializes in conceptual surrealist photography. She began her photographic career with documentary photography, but quickly moved to surrealism. She began participating in international contests in July 2008, and won second place in Nikon's 2008–2009 photo context with Fishing in Hitchcock's Style, in the My Planet category. Her altered photo of Manarola, Italy, was a finalist in The Smithsonian&apos;s 11th annual photo contest (2013), in the altered images category. The photo, named Babylon, was inspired by Pieter Bruegel's The Tower of Babel

In the same year, her photo Elegy of Autumn won the grand prize at the Nikon Photo Contest, selected from over 100,000 entries – the first Israeli entry to have won. She describes her style as Truthful Fiction, as, according to her, "fiction may not reflect the reality as we know it, yet conveys a deep, accurate and true message". Bova lists Jan Saudek as a major inspiration.

Bova has designed album covers for a number of Israeli and Jewish musicians, including Orphaned Land and its former member Yossi Sassi, RebbeSoul and others. The Orphaned Land album cover, for the album The Road to Or Shalem, was also inspired by another Bruegel painting, The Blind Leading the Blind, and combined a photograph of the musicians with the skyline of Melbourne, Australia. She has also had artistic collaborations with Maria Kong, Yisrael Aharoni and German Kabirski.

Bova has exhibited her works in the Salon d'Automne, and has had numerous solo exhibitions, including The Truth in the Lie, Distillation of a Fantastic Reality (in Rishon Lezion), and others. She was a major contributor to the Beauty Saves the World (BSW) photography project started by her husband, which focused on fine-art photography and exhibited in multiple countries. She has taught at Galitz School of Photography in Ramat Gan, Israel, and writes guides and tutorials for various photography magazines, such as 1x and Practical Photoshop. She has given numerous talks, including in the Annual Israeli Photography Convention in 2014. She has published a book with her photographs in 2013, called Truthful Fiction, with a second edition released in 2014.

Personal life
Bova was born in Moscow in 1977 and has resided in Israel since 1991. She holds a B.Sc. in computer science from Tel Aviv University. Bova works as a researcher and algorithm engineer in the field of artificial intelligence. She is married to Gadi Boleslavsky, who serves as her manager.

Awards
Bova has received the following photography awards and prizes. In all, over 100 of her photographs received over 400 awards.
 2009 – Trierenberg Super Circuit – Vöav gold medal
 2010 – Trierenberg Super Circuit – gold medal of excellence
 2010 – Julia Cameron Awards – two prizes and an honorable mention
 2010 – Aquëducte Biennale – gold aquëducte author
 2011 – Prix de la Photographie Paris – 1st place, fine art
 2011 – DonkeyArtPrize New York – grand prize
 2012 – Trierenberg Super Circuit – gold medal of excellence
 2012 – Professional Women Photographers – grand prize
 2013 – Nikon International Photo Contest – grand prize
 2014 – Prix de la Photographie Paris – gold, fine art/people

Selected exhibitions
Bova's work was featured, but not limited to, the following exhibitions.
 2010 – Three Women, Three Worlds, Tel Aviv University, Tel Aviv, Israel
 2010 – Magic Realism, Tel Aviv, Israel
 2011 – Magic Realism, Moscow, Russia
 2012 – Point of Branching. Fragility. Objective Reality, Molbert Gallery, Saint Petersburg, Russia
 2012 – Salon d'Automne, Tel Aviv, Israel
 2012 – Pixel in the Hand of the Artist (solo), Tel-Hai Museum of Photography, Israel
 2013 – Truthful Fiction (solo), Weil Center, Kfar Shmaryahu, Israel
 2013 – Forever and the Earth (solo), Konenkov Museum of Russian Academy of Arts, Moscow
 2014 – Essence of Fantastic Reality, Rishon LeZion Culture Hall, Israel
 2015 – NordArt, Kunstwerk Carlshütte, Büdelsdorf, Germany
 2018 – Beauty Matters, International Photography Festival, Tel Aviv, Israel
 2019 – International Women's Day Exhibition, Farkash Gallery, Jaffa, Israel
 2022 – It's a Mad World virtual exhibition
 2022 – Berlin Photo Week

References

External links
 
 Dina Bova at 1x.com
 An interview with Bova at ArtJobs.com

1977 births
Living people
Israeli computer scientists
Israeli photographers
Israeli graphic designers
Israeli surrealist artists
Artists from Moscow